Marco Venier (died 1311) was a Lord of Cerigo.

Ancestry
He was a son of Bartolommeo Venier (fl. between 1252 and 1275), and paternal grandson of Marco Venier, Marquess of Cerigo.

Marriage and issue
He married an unknown woman and had Pietro Venier (- bef. 1360), who married Bonafemena Quirini and had Marco Venier, fl. in 1347 and 1363, who married Caterina ... and had Pietro Venier, Governor of Cerigo.

References

 Ancestry of Sultana Nur-Banu (Cecilia Venier-Baffo)

1311 deaths
Kythira
Marco
Year of birth unknown